Bradshaw Crandell (June 14, 1896 – January 25, 1966) was an American artist and illustrator. He was known as the "artist of the stars". Among those who posed for Crandell were Carole Lombard, Bette Davis, Judy Garland, Veronica Lake and Lana Turner. In 1921, he began his career with an ad for Lorraine hair nets sold exclusively by F. W. Woolworth. His first cover illustration was the May 28, 1921 issue for the humor magazine Judge. In later life, he went from illustrations to oil-on-canvas paintings which included political figures. He also provided poster work for 20th Century Fox. In 2006, he was inducted into the Society of Illustrators Hall of Fame. In March 2010, an illustration for the 1952 Dutch Treat Club yearbook of Crandell's sold for $17,000.

Early life
John Bradshaw Crandell was born in Glens Falls, New York in 1896, son of Hubert Lee and Vira (Mills) Crandell.  Hubert's grandfather, born Peter Crandall, thought "the better way to spell the last name was Crandell instead of the original spelling used by the immigrant ancestor, Elder John Crandall.  Crandell attended classes at the School of the Art Institute of Chicago but did not graduate. Instead he enrolled in Wesleyan University and again did not graduate. His 1918 World War I draft registration card noted he was a student.  The twelfth general catalog of the Psi Upsilon fraternity lists him under the Xi Chapter for the year 1919 (from Wesleyan).

Career
Crandall's career took off in 1921 with a contract for the cover of Judge magazine.  Although he began his business as John Bradshaw Crandell Studios in 1925, he dropped his first name by 1935.  He was known as a "glamour" artist and not necessarily a "pin-up" artist; however, he did have rather risque work, such as the two nude water nymphs and a nude cover for the Dutch Treat Club.  In the 1950s, Crandall moved from illustrations to oil and portraits.

Crandall also created art for the Gerlach-Barklow Co., an art calendar factory in Joliet, Illinois.

Some of Crandell's work is on display in Vanderbilt Hall, a mansion hotel in Newport, Rhode Island owned by Peter de Savary.   Phyllis Brown often graced the covers of Cosmopolitan and she was a well sought after model.  An incident is told that Gerald Ford suggested the future Mrs. Betty Ford meet with two of his favorite friends when he heard of a trip she made to New York.  Those friends being Mr. and Mrs. Bradshaw Crandell; however, when Phyllis arrived or as the future first lady put it later "In she slinked, Jerry's model" (Jerry had dated Phyllis) in a low cut very revealing outfit and then had the audacity to steal her escort.  Both Crandell and Ford were innocent of any wrongdoing, though, as Phyllis admitted it was all her idea.

Advertising

The following is a partial list of some of Crandell's works and is by no means exhaustive:
 1921:  F. W. Woolworth's ad for Lorraine hair nets
 1921, 1937: Chesterfield ad
 1921: Judge (magazine) cover
 1924-7: Collier's cover
 1925-6:  The Designer cover
 1926-8, 1934-5, 1937: Saturday Evening Post cover
 1926, 1928:  Modern Priscilla cover
 1927, 1931-2:  Physical Culture cover
 1928:  Mazola Oil ad
 1929:  Cudahy's Puritan Bacon ad
 1929:  The Great Atlantic & Pacific Tea Company (A&P) ad
 1930:  College Humor cover
 1930:  Life cover
 c 1930: Old Gold cigarette ad
 1931:  Schrafft's candy ad
 1931, 1933: Farmer's Wife cover
 1932:  Gerlack-Barklow calendars
 1933: The American Magazine cover
 1933: Palmolive soap ad
 1935-1940, 1944-6: Cosmopolitan cover
 1936: Buick ad
 1938:  Coca-Cola serving tray
 1939:  Lucky Strike calendar ad
 1940: Pabst beer ad
 1941: American Red Cross poster ad
 1941-1944: John Player & Sons Cigarette ads
 1943: Pontiac ads (honoring all arms and services of the fighting forces)
 1943: Women's Army Corps recruiting poster
 1944:  Tangee face powder ad
 1948:  Edgeworth pipe tobacco ad
1948:  The Loves of Carmen starring Rita Hayworth and Glenn Ford, Columbia Pictures theatrical release poster
 1949:  Lord Calvert whiskey ad
 unknown: Redbook only editorial or story illustration per Crandell himself

Portraits, memorials, and other works

Stars
 Lana Turner
Rita Hayworth and Glenn Ford
 Susan Hayward
 Judy Garland
 Veronica Lake
 Carole Lombard
 Bette Davis
 Olivia de Havilland
 Rosemary Lane, one of the Lane Sisters
 Gloria Callen
 Joan Bennett
 Joan Fontaine
 Anne Baxter
 Betty Hutton
 Jennifer Jones
 Lucille Ball
 Helen Twelvetrees

Politicians
 W. D. Hoard Jr., son of governor of Wisconsin
 Walter J. Kohler Jr., governor of Wisconsin

Others
 James Montgomery Flagg fellow artist who gave us the popular Uncle Sam poster of "We Want You for US Army"

References

External links and further reading
 Platnick, Norman I. "Roses of Romance: A Collector's Guide to Bradshaw Crandell", Enchanment Ink, Bay Shore, New York, 2003
 American Art Archives 
 Curtis Licensing 

1896 births
1966 deaths
American illustrators
Wesleyan University alumni
Psi Upsilon